Ayni District, also Aini District (Nohiyayi Aynī), is a district in the southern part of Sughd Region, Tajikistan, straddling the middle course of the river Zeravshan. Its capital is the town of Ayni, located on the Zeravshan. The population of the district is 83,600 (January 2020 estimate). It was named after the Tajik national poet Sadriddin Ayni. India established a base at Ayni in Tajikistan, which was used to assist the Northern Alliance during the Taliban regime.

Administrative divisions
They are as follows:

References

External links
 

Districts of Tajikistan
Sughd Region